Sultanayevo (Soltanay) is a rural locality (a village) in Kalmiyabashevsky Selsoviet, Kaltasinsky District, Bashkortostan, Russia. The population was 61 as of 2010. There are 2 streets.

Geography 
Sultanayevo is located 16 km southeast of Kaltasy (the district's administrative centre) by road. Kalmiyabash is the nearest rural locality.

References 

Rural localities in Kaltasinsky District